Junagadh is one of the 182 Legislative Assembly constituencies of Gujarat state in India. It is part of Junagadh district.

List of segments
This assembly seat represents the following segments:

 Junagadh Taluka (Part) Villages – Goladhar, Vadasimdi, Vanandiya, Jhalansar, Makhiyala, Pipardi Timbo, Majevdi, Patrapsar, Ambaliya, Rupavati, Taliyadhar, Vadhavi, Virpur, Galiyavada, Khalilpur, Sagdividi, Ivnagar, Palasva, Padariya, Datar Hills.
 Junagadh Taluka (Part) – Junagadh Municipal Corporation Ward No.-1, 2, 3, 4, 5, 6, 7, 8, 10, 11, 12, 13, 14, 15, 16,17.

Members of Legislative Assembly
 1962: Kundanlal Divyakant, Indian National Congress
 1967: P. K. Dave, Indian National Congress
 1972: Divyakant K Manavati, Indian National Congress
 1975: Hemaben Acharya, Bharatiya Jan Sangh
 1980: Gordhanbhai Patel, Indian National Congress (I) 
 1985: Gordhanbhai Patel, Indian National Congress
 1990: Mahendra Mashru, Independent
 1995: Mahendra Mashru, Independent
 1998: Mahendra Mashru, Bharatiya Janata Party
 2002: Mahendra Mashru, Bharatiya Janata Party
 2007: Mahendra Mashru, Bharatiya Janata Party
 2012: Mahendra Mashru, Bharatiya Janata Party
 2017: Bhikhabhai Galabhai Joshi, Indian National Congress
 2022: Sanjay Koradia, Bharatiya Janata Party

Election results

2022

2017

2012

See also
 List of constituencies of Gujarat Legislative Assembly
 Gujarat Legislative Assembly

References

External links
 

Assembly constituencies of Gujarat
Junagadh district
Junagadh